The 1757 raid on Berlin  took place during the Third Silesian War (part of the Seven Years' War). Cavalrymen of the Holy Roman Empire attacked and briefly occupied Berlin, the capital of Prussia.

Background
After the War of the Austrian Succession, traditional European alliances fell apart and were replaced by an Anglo-Prussian pact and a Franco-Austrian alliance.  Known as the Diplomatic Revolution, these events caused the Seven Years' War. Frederick II, King of Prussia and bitter rival of the Holy Roman Empress Maria Theresa of Austria, invaded Silesia in 1756 but suffered his first defeat at Kolín on June 18.  In the aftermath of the battle, however, Frederick neglected to protect the approach to his capital, Berlin.

Battle
Austrian commanders noticed this flaw, and Prince Charles of Lorraine, commander of Austrian troops facing Frederick's main army, dispatched Hungarian cavalry officer Count András Hadik and a force of about 5,100 men, mostly Hungarian hussars, to capture the city.  However, to guard his main base at Elsterwerda, Hadik left behind enough troops that his raiding party was outnumbered by the unsuspecting Berlin garrison.

On 16 October Hadik and his raiding force arrived outside of Berlin.  Although the Prussian defenders were surprised, they refused Hadik's surrender demands. Hadik promptly attacked the city gates, entering the city. The city's military governor, General von Rochow, believed that his forces were outnumbered and spirited the Royal Family to Spandau, while Hadik demanded that the city council pay a ransom of 200,000 thalers and a dozen pairs of gloves for the Empress.  The ransom was paid, but Hadik left the city hurriedly when he realized that a significant Prussian force under the Prince of Anhalt-Dessau was marching toward Berlin in an attempt to intercept him.

References

Military history of Prussia
18th century in Berlin
Battles of the Seven Years' War
Battles involving the Holy Roman Empire
Battles involving Prussia
Cavalry raids
Conflicts in 1757
Berlin raid
1757 in the Holy Roman Empire
Military history of Berlin
Battles of the Silesian Wars